Darwin Was Right is a 1924 American comedy film directed by Lewis Seiler and written by Eddie Moran. The film stars Nell Brantley, George O'Hara, Stanley Blystone, Dan Mason, Lon Poff and Bud Jamison. The film was released on October 26, 1924, by Fox Film Corporation.

Plot
As described in a review in a film magazine:

Cast

Preservation
With no copies of Darwin Was Right located in any film archives, it is a lost film.

References

External links

Lantern slide at worthpoint.com
Lobby cards at GettyImages

1924 films
1920s English-language films
Silent American comedy films
1924 comedy films
Fox Film films
Films directed by Lewis Seiler
American silent feature films
American black-and-white films
1920s American films